Meath Park is a village in the Canadian province of Saskatchewan within the Rural Municipality of Garden River No. 490 and Census Division No. 15.

History 
Meath Park incorporated as a village on May 23, 1938.

Demographics 

See also 

 List of communities in Saskatchewan
 Villages of Saskatchewan

Footnotes

External links
Meath Park Village Council
Saskatchewan City & Town Maps
Saskatchewan Gen Web - One Room School Project 
Post Offices and Postmasters - ArchiviaNet - Library and Archives Canada
Saskatchewan Gen Web Region
Online Historical Map Digitization Project
GeoNames Query 
2001 Community Profiles

Villages in Saskatchewan
Garden River No. 490, Saskatchewan
Division No. 15, Saskatchewan